Wave 105 is an Independent Regional Radio station based in Fareham, England, owned and operated by Bauer as part of the Hits Radio network. It broadcasts to South Hampshire, the Isle of Wight, West Sussex and Wiltshire, and until September 2022 could also received in parts of Dorset on FM.

As of December 2022, the station has a weekly audience of 395,000 listeners according to RAJAR.

History
Based in a studio complex at Segensworth East, on the outskirts of Fareham, the station broadcasts on 105.2 MHz (South Hampshire, Isle of Wight, West Sussex, East Dorset and Wiltshire), as well as on DAB digital radio via the South Hampshire and Bournemouth local multiplexes, and online. News is provided by Wave 105's local news team in conjunction with Sky News Radio.

Wave 105 began broadcasting on 14 June 1998. 

Wave 105 revealed its highest listening figures ever in December 2013. Audience research from RAJAR showed the station had 438,000 people tuning in, for an average of 10.3 hours a week, delivering 4,520,000 total listening hours each week, making it the commercial leader in the south of England for 2013.

The station was previously the title sponsor of Poole Stadium.

On 19 September 2022, the Bournemouth and Poole relay of Wave 105 on 105.8 FM was replaced by a relay of Greatest Hits Radio Dorset.

Ownership 
Owned by media company Bauer, Wave 105 was initially created by a group of private investors under the name of The Radio Partnership. The station was then sold to Kelvin MacKenzie's Wireless Group.  The Wireless Group eventually sold Wave 105 to Scottish Radio Holdings (SRH) who were acquired by EMAP in 2005.

Awards 
In 2004, Wave 105 won the NTL Commercial Radio Station of the Year award in the category for stations with a potential audience of over one million listeners.

Transmitters

Analogue (FM)

Digital (DAB)

References

External links 
 

Bauer Radio
Radio stations established in 1998
Radio stations in Sussex
Radio stations in Hampshire
Radio stations in Dorset
Radio stations in the Isle of Wight
Radio stations in Wiltshire
Bauer City network